Compagnie Financière Richemont S.A., commonly known as Richemont, is a Switzerland-based luxury goods holding company founded in 1988 by South African businessman Johann Rupert. Through its various subsidiaries, Richemont produces and sells jewellery, watches, leather goods, pens, firearms, clothing, and accessories. Richemont is publicly traded as CFR on the SIX Swiss Exchange and the JSE.

The brands it owns include A. Lange & Söhne, Azzedine Alaïa, Baume & Mercier, Buccellati, Cartier, Chloé, Dunhill, IWC Schaffhausen, Giampiero Bodino, Jaeger-LeCoultre, Montblanc, Officine Panerai, Piaget, Peter Millar, Purdey, Roger Dubuis, Vacheron Constantin, Van Cleef & Arpels and Delvaux.

, Compagnie Financière Richemont S.A. was the sixth-largest corporation by market capitalization in the Swiss Market Index. As of 2017, Richemont was the third-largest luxury goods company in the world after LVMH and Estée Lauder Companies.

History
Johann Rupert founded Compagnie Financière Richemont S.A. when he spun off the international assets of Rembrandt Group Ltd. (now Remgro Limited), a South Africa-based company founded in the 1940s by his father, Anton Rupert. The division, originally founded on 5 March 1979 as Intercontinental Mining and Resources S.A., was later renamed IMR Group S.A. on 31 March 1987 and finally Richemont S.A. on 17 August 1988. The spin-off was completed on 20 September 1988. The luxury goods investments of Rembrandt Group combined with Rothmans International formed the initial group of Richemont subsidiaries.

In March 2007, Richemont and Polo Ralph Lauren Inc. announced the formation of a 50/50 joint venture, the Polo Ralph Lauren Watch and Jewelry Company SÀRL.

In October 2008, the Group divested all of its remaining interests in the tobacco industry.

, Compagnie Financière Richemont S.A. is the sixth largest corporation by market capitalization in the Swiss Market Index. As of 2014, Richemont is the second-largest luxury goods company in the world after LVMH.

The compensation of the Richemont group's executives increased by an average of 14% in 2018.

Organization
Compagnie Financière Richemont S.A. organizes its business activities into three operating divisions: Jewellery Maisons, Specialist Watchmakers and Other Businesses.

Cartier, Van Cleef & Arpels, and Buccellati constitute the Jewellery Maisons.

The Specialist Watchmakers group is composed of A. Lange & Söhne, Baume & Mercier, IWC Schaffhausen, Jaeger-LeCoultre, Officine Panerai, Piaget, Roger Dubuis, Vacheron Constantin and the joint venture with the Ralph Lauren Watch & Jewelry Co.

The Other Businesses division includes Azzedine Alaïa, Chloé, Delvaux, Dunhill, Montblanc, Peter Millar, and Purdey.

Ownership and control
The largest significant shareholder of Compagnie Financière Richemont S.A. is Compagnie Financière Rupert, a Swiss company that holds shares controlled and principally owned by Johann Rupert. Compagnie Financière Rupert owns 522,000,000 Class "B" shares of Compagnie Financière Richemont S.A., representing 9.1% of the equity and 50% of the voting rights. Johann Rupert and Compagnie Financière Rupert also hold 2,836,664 class "A" shares or "A" share equivalents as of the end of March 2016.

Investments

Subsidiaries
The following companies are wholly owned subsidiaries of Compagnie Financière Richemont S.A., unless otherwise noted.
 A. Lange & Söhne — watches; based in Glashütte, Germany
 Azzedine Alaïa — women's fashions; based in Paris, France
 BAUME — watches; based in Geneva, Switzerland 
 Buccellati — fine jewellery and watches; based in Milan, Italy
 Giampiero Bodino — fine jewellery; based in Milan, Italy
 IWC Schaffhausen — watches; based in Schaffhausen, Switzerland
 Jaeger-LeCoultre — watches; based in Le Sentier, Switzerland
 Officine Panerai — watches; based in Geneva, Switzerland
 Peter Millar — men's and women's apparel; based in Raleigh, North Carolina, U.S.
 Purdey — firearms, clothing, gifts, leather goods, Royal Berkshire Shooting School; based in London, United Kingdom
 Roger Dubuis — watches; based in Geneva, Switzerland
 Van Cleef & Arpels — jewellery, watches; based in Paris, France
 Vendôme Luxury Group, including: 
 Baume & Mercier — watches; based in Geneva, Switzerland
 Cartier — jewellery and watches; based in Paris, France
 Chloé — women's clothing; based in Paris, France
 Dunhill — men's clothing, watches and leather goods; based in London, United Kingdom
 Montblanc — writing instruments and watches; based in Hamburg, Germany
 Piaget — jewellery, watches; based in Geneva, Switzerland
 Vacheron Constantin — watches; based in Geneva, Switzerland
Watchfinder & Co. — second-hand watches; based in Kings Hill, United Kingdom

Joint ventures
 Ralph Lauren Watch and Jewelry Co. (50%) — watches and jewellery; based in Geneva, Switzerland.

Other investments
 YOOX NET-A-PORTER GROUP — ecommerce; based in Milan, Italy.

Former investments
Richemont acquired British clothing retailer Hackett Limited in 1992. On 2 June 2005, Richemont announced its sale to Spanish investment company Torreal S.C.R., S.A.

In 1998, Richemont bought a controlling stake in Shanghai Tang. In July 2017, Richemont announced that it had sold Shanghai Tang to a group of investors headed by Italian entrepreneur Alessandro Bastagli.

In 2000, the Group sold its minority stake in Vivendi, representing its exit from all previous media interests, which had included NetHold and Canal+.

Richemont and Mimi So formed a joint venture in 2004, Richemont's first investment in an American brand. In 2007, Richemont requested to become the majority partner of the joint venture. Mimi So declined and purchased Richemont's stake in the venture.

In 2008, Richemont spun off all of its non-luxury goods businesses, principally Richemont's stake in British American Tobacco, into a newly formed, separately traded holding company, Reinet Investments S.C.A.

In 2015, the  Net-a-Porter Group was merged with the YOOX Group in an all-share transaction. Richemont is the largest shareholder in the enlarged group.

In 2018, Richemont sold Lancel to the Italian leather goods company Piquadro Group.

Website blocking 
In October 2014, the first blocking order against trademark-infringing consumer goods was passed against the major British Internet service providers by Richemont, Cartier International and Montblanc to block several domains selling trademark-infringing products.

Notes

References

External links 
 

 
Luxury brand holding companies
Companies based in Geneva
Holding companies established in 1988
Watchmaking conglomerates
Watch manufacturing companies of Switzerland
Multinational companies headquartered in Switzerland
Companies listed on the SIX Swiss Exchange
Companies listed on the Johannesburg Stock Exchange